The Forensic Science Regulator is the regulator of forensic science activities within the United Kingdom's legal system. The regulator is advised by the Forensic Science Advisory Council. The post dates from 2008.

The office of Forensic Science Regulator was originally created without any statutory powers. , the government was considering giving the Forensic Science Regulator statutory powers.

The Forensic Science Regulator Act 2021 made the role of the Forensic Science Regulator a statutory one and requires the Regulator to prepare and publish a code of practice. The Act also introduces new statutory powers for the Regulator to investigate and issues compliance notices where they have concerns about how a forensic science activity is being conducted. 

The first Forensic Science Regulator was Andrew Rennison. Dr Gillian Tully was appointed to hold the post for three years from November 2014. In November 2017 Dr Tully was re-appointed for a further three years until November 2020. In her 2018 annual report, Tully urged the UK Government to put the role of the Forensic Science Regulator on a statutory footing.

See also 
 Forensic Science Service

References

External links 
 https://www.gov.uk/government/organisations/forensic-science-regulator

2008 establishments in the United Kingdom
Regulators of the United Kingdom